Koço Dinella (born 23 April 1947) is an Albanian footballer. He played in eight matches for the Albania national football team from 1967 to 1973.

References

External links
 

1947 births
Living people
Albanian footballers
Albania international footballers
Place of birth missing (living people)
Association football goalkeepers
FK Dinamo Tirana players
KF Tirana players
KF Skënderbeu Korçë players